Athenodoros, Athenodorus or Athinodoros may refer to:

 Athenodorus (actor) (fl. 342–329 BC), Greek actor
 Athenodorus of Soli (fl. mid-3rd century BC), Stoic philosopher and disciple of Zeno of Citium
 Athenodorus of Imbros (4th century BC), ancient Greek mercenary
 Athenodoros Cananites (74–7 BC), Stoic philosopher
 Athenodoros Cordylion (fl. early-mid 1st century BC), Stoic philosopher and keeper of the library of Pergamum
 Athenodorus (fl. 1st century BC), sculptor and son and pupil of Agesander of Rhodes
 Athenodorus of Byzantium, (fl. 2nd century AD), bishop of Byzantium from 144 until 148
 Athenodorus (Isaurian general) (fl. 5th century AD), Isaurian general of the Isaurian War
 Claudius Athenodorus (fl. 1st century AD), Roman eques
 Athinodoros Prousalis (1926–2012), Greek actor